The People First Party (PFP) is a centrist or centre-right political party in the Republic of China (Taiwan).

History

The PFP was founded by James Soong and his supporters after his failed independent bid for the presidency in 2000. Soong himself is the chairman, and dominates much of its politics. The name of the party, People First (親民), has Confucian connotations.

The official goals of PFP, as regards to cross-strait relationships and diplomacy, is for the ROC to: participate in more international organizations, promote Chinese culture overseas and seek economic and cultural interaction between Taiwan and the mainland. Its views are seen as generally favorable towards Chinese unification and staunchly against Taiwan independence.

The party maintains a close but tense relationship with the Kuomintang (KMT) as part of the pan-blue coalition. However, since PFP had, like the New Party, grown out of the KMT, the two parties had to compete for the same set of voters. This dynamic in which both the KMT and PFP must simultaneously compete and cooperate with each other has led to complex and interesting politics.

In several notable cases, this has led to situations in which both parties have run candidates, but close to the election the party with the less popular candidate unofficially dropped out of the race. This in turn has led to some notable situations when either the PFP or the KMT has campaigned against its own candidate, which has led to intra-party resentment.

To avoid a repeat of this effect, which led to the election of Democratic Progressive Party candidate Chen Shui-bian to the presidency in 2000 by a low share of votes, Chairman Soong ran as vice-president on KMT Chairman Lien Chan's presidential ticket in the 2004 presidential election.

After his defeat in Taipei mayoral election on 9 December 2006, Soong announced that he would retire from politics. At this point, with no clear goals, the PFP faced an uncertain future, and considered merging with the Kuomintang (KMT). After much negotiation, the PFP and the KMT did not merge.

Presidential bids 

In September 2011, James Soong mounted the PFP's first presidential bid and selected academic Ruey-Shiung Lin to be his running mate for the 2012 election, collecting enough signatures to make it on the ballot.  While analysts feared that a PFP run would split the Pan-Blue Coalition vote and hand a winnable election to the DPP (as was the case in the 2000 Presidential election), Soong insisted that his campaign was a serious one and that he would complete his run. On election day, the Soong-Lin ticket underperformed and garnered 2.77% of votes, while Ma Ying-jeou of the KMT defeated Tsai Ing-wen of the DPP by a margin of 51.60% to 45.63%.  In the concurrent legislative election the PFP won 5.46% of the party-list vote, gaining them 2 seats in the Legislative Yuan, and in addition won 1 district seat for a total of 3 seats.

Soong would launch presidential bids in 2016 and 2020 as well.  In 2016 he would garner 12.84% of the vote, compared with 31.04% going to Eric Chu of the KMT and 56.12% going to Tsai Ing-wen of the DPP.  In 2020 he would garner 4.26% of the vote, compared with 38.61% going to Han Kuo-yu of the KMT and 57.13% going to Tsai Ing-wen of the DPP.  In 2016 they would maintain their seats in the legislature; however, in 2020, the PFP failed to meet the 5% threshold for party-list representation and also did not win any district seats, and was no longer represented in the Legislative Yuan.  Prior to the election result in 2020, James Soong announced that his 2020 bid would be his last, throwing the future of the party into question.

Election results

Presidential elections

Legislative elections

Local elections

National Assembly elections

See also
 Politics of the Republic of China 
 Elections in Taiwan
 List of political parties in Taiwan

Notes

References

External links

People First Party Official Website

Political parties in Taiwan
Conservative parties in Taiwan
Liberal conservative parties
Centre-right parties in Asia
Centrist parties in Asia
Political parties established in 2000
2000 establishments in Taiwan